The Australian Privacy Commissioner is an independent statutory office-holder, appointed under subsection 14 (4) of the Australian Information Commissioner Act 2010. The Privacy Commissioner is one of three commissioners in the Office of the Australian Information Commissioner, and has functions relating to privacy and freedom of information.

Angelene Falk is the current Privacy Commissioner.

History
Prior to the Australian Information Commissioner Act 2010, the Privacy Commissioner was the Commissioner with respect to privacy legislation.  Under the 2010 amendments  to the Privacy Act (1988) the Information Commissioner became the Commissioner with respect to privacy legislation.

References

External links
Office of the Australian Information Commissioner website
Australian Information Commissioner Act 2010

Commonwealth Government agencies of Australia
Privacy in Australia